Pseudolabis is an extinct genus of camelid endemic to North America. Fossils have been found on two sites in Wyoming and Nebraska.

References

Prehistoric camelids
Oligocene even-toed ungulates
Miocene even-toed ungulates
Aquitanian genus extinctions
Cenozoic mammals of North America
Chattian genus first appearances
Prehistoric even-toed ungulate genera